Katarzyna Mirosława Majchrzak-Waśniewska (born June 25, 1967 in Gdańsk, Pomorskie) is a former female high jumper from Poland, who represented her native country at the 1992 Summer Olympics in Barcelona, Spain. She set her personal best (1.92 m) in the women's high jump event in 1992.

International competitions

References
 sports-reference

1967 births
Living people
Polish female high jumpers
Athletes (track and field) at the 1992 Summer Olympics
Olympic athletes of Poland
Sportspeople from Gdańsk